Prince Auguste Marie Raymond d'Arenberg, Count of La Marck Grandee of Spain (30 August 1753 – 26 September 1833), was the second son and fourth child of Charles, 5th Duke of Arenberg, the head of the House of Arenberg (who then still held the rank of sovereign princes).

Early life

Father
Arenberg was born on 30 August 1753 at Brussels, where his father resided. The duke, who had served with great distinction during the Seven Years' War, and was a field-marshal in the Austrian army, originally intended Prince Auguste for the same service, in which he began his career at the age of fifteen; but family circumstances altered his career.

Uncle
Louis Engelbert, Count of La Marck, the last of his name, and the father-in-law of Charles, 5th Duke of Arenberg, was the officer of a regiment of German infantry in the service of France, and, having no son, proposed that Prince Auguste should enter the French service, offering, if he did so, to give him his regiment. The proposition was accepted, and it was further arranged that on the death of his maternal grandfather, the young prince should take the title of Comte de La Marck, by which he subsequently became known.

Move to France
The House of Arenberg had long borne arms in the Austrian army, but was a sovereign house, its members free to take service wherever they pleased; the Duke of Arenberg, however, who stood high in the estimation of the Empress-Queen, Maria Theresa, judged it advisable to obtain her consent to this change in the career of his son. The request was made at the very moment when the marriage was decided on between the Archduchess Marie Antoinette and the Dauphin of France; and the empress, in acceding to it, strongly recommended the Prince of Arenberg to her daughter. He was accordingly presented in due form to Louis XV, assisted at all the fêtes which were given on the occasion of the marriage, was warmly welcomed by the dauphine, and honored by a kindness and confidence never afterwards withdrawn. Consequently, La Marck was a zealous defender of Marie Antoinette, whom he endeavored to represent as much less disposed towards political interference—until the gravity of events compelled her to interfere—than she has often described during his later life.

Military career

Title
After being thus presented, Prince Auguste joined his regiment in the South of France, remained with it for a year to learn his duty, and then, at the age of 20, returned to court, where, having succeeded to his grandfather's title, and being invested with the rank of Grandee of Spain, he enjoyed every facility for establishing a political and social connection of the highest kind.

Duel
La Marck distinguishing himself in India fighting under Count de Bussy, and from whence he returned severely wounded. On his return he was involved in a duel in Paris with a former young Swedish officer of his regiment, called M. Peyron. La Marck and Peyron had exchanged words before La Marck's regiment had embarked for India when Peyron had resigned his commission. They fought with swords, and after a few passes M. Peyron fell dead, having received a sword thrust through an eye. The Count perceived at the same moment that he also was wounded, by a torrent of blood which gushed from his mouth. M. Peyron's sword had in fact pierced his lungs just below the armpit, leaving a slight mark on his back.

La Marck recovered from his wounds and directed his martial qualities towards his military career. He bestowed considerable pains on the discipline of his regiment, which became a model for the rest of the service, was appointed inspector-general of infantry, and finally vice-president of the committee for regulating the tactics of the troops of the line, in which latter capacity he acquired considerable reputation.

Court life
These duties were La Marck's chief occupation till 1789, apart from them, having married in 1776, La Marck led an agreeable life, alternately at Raismes, his country residence near Valenciennes, and at Versailles, where his rank and position gave him the means of observing all that was passing, which he appears to have noted with care and tolerable impartiality. As he had no personal interests to serve, sought no employment, needed no title, had ample wealth, and, the ties of friendship excepted, stood aloof from all who sought the monarch's levée or the minister's ante-chamber.

Political career

Friendship with Mirabeau
In 1789 La Marck met with Count de Mirabeau at a dinner given by the Prince de Poix, the Governor of Versailles, to which Mirabeau was taken by M. de Meilhan, a friend of La Marck. Though La Marck and Mirabeau met each other several times after this on terms of growing intimacy, it was not till the convocation of States-General, in 1789, that their friendship became closely cemented.

La Marck, who was friend of both the queen and Mirabeau, became a communicator between them. After the march on Versailles, La Marck consulted Mirabeau as to what measures the king ought to take, and Mirabeau drew up a state paper, which was presented to the king by Monsieur, afterwards Louis XVIII. However, as events unfolded these negotiations came to nothing.

Revolution
During this period La Marck was first a member of the States-general, and afterwards of the National Assembly. However he was deprived of command of his regiment by the National Assembly and when the royal cause became hopeless he left France, and entered the Austrian army with the rank of major-general. He was employed as a diplomat on various occasions, but never on any military service. On his brother's establishment at Paris, he was anxious to re-enter the service of France; this however Napoleon would not allow him to do, and he remained at Vienna till 1814, when he came to Brussels, and was made lieutenant-general by the new king of the Netherlands. He left the Dutch army after the revolution of 1830, and died in 1833.

Art collection
After his retirement in 1830 he began collecting art for his residences. His collection passed on his death in 1833 to Prosper Louis, 7th Duke of Arenberg.

References

Correspondance entre le Comte de Mirabeau et le Comte de La Marck, pendant les annees 1789, 1790, et 1791. Recueillie, raise en ordre et publiee par M. Ad. de Bacourt, Ancien Ambassadeur de France pres la Cour de Sardaigne. Three vols. Paris: 1851.

Attribution

1753 births
1833 deaths
Nobility from Brussels
Auguste Marie Raymond
Grandees of Spain
French duellists
Generals of the Holy Roman Empire
Military personnel from Brussels